The red-tailed calyptotis (Calyptotis ruficauda)  is a species of skink found in New South Wales in Australia. They are oviparous reptiles, and they are apart of the scincidae family.

References

Calyptotis
Reptiles described in 1983
Taxa named by Allen Eddy Greer